Ukraine men's national goalball team is the men's national team of Ukraine. Goalball is a team sport designed specifically for athletes with a vision impairment.  The team takes part in international competitions.

Paralympic Games

2020 Tokyo 
 

The team competed in the 2020 Summer Paralympics, with competition from Wednesday 25 August to finals on Friday 3 September 2021, in the Makuhari Messe arena, Chiba, Tokyo, Japan.  

Round-robin

World Championships  

IBSA World Goalball Championships have been held every four years from 1978.  Placing first or second in the tournament may earn a berth in the Paralympic Games goalball tournaments.

2022 Matosinhos 

The team competed in the 2022 World Championships from 7 to 16 December 2022, at the Centro de Desportos e Congressos de Matosinhos, Portugal.  There were sixteen men's and sixteen women's teams.  They placed third in Pool D, winning four of seven games, and third in final standings behind Brazil and China.

Regional championships 

The team competes in the IBSA Europe goalball region.  Groups A and C are held one year, and Group B the following year.  Strong teams move towards Group A.

See also 

 Disabled sports 
 Ukraine women's national goalball team
 Ukraine at the Paralympics

References

National men's goalball teams
Ukraine at the Paralympics
European national goalball teams